John Wilson (August 11, 1773August 13, 1828) was a U.S. Representative from South Carolina.

Born at Wilson's Ferry in the Province of South Carolina, Wilson attended the common schools.
He engaged in agricultural pursuits in Anderson County, near Golden Grove, South Carolina.
Also, he operated a public ferry across the Saluda River at what is now known as Pelzer.
He served as member of the State house of representatives from 1812 to 1817.

Wilson was elected to the Seventeenth, Eighteenth and Nineteenth Congresses (March 4, 1821 – March 3, 1827).

He was an unsuccessful candidate for re-election in 1826 to the Twentieth Congress.

He died at his home near Golden Grove, in Anderson County, South Carolina, August 13, 1828.
He was interred in the family cemetery on his plantation, which is now a part of the industrial city of Pelzer, South Carolina.

See also
List of United States representatives from South Carolina
Politics of the United States

Sources

1773 births
1828 deaths
People from Pelzer, South Carolina
Democratic-Republican Party members of the United States House of Representatives from South Carolina
Jacksonian members of the United States House of Representatives from South Carolina
19th-century American politicians